Valdumar Augusto Té (born 14 August 1997) is a Guinea-Bissauan professional footballer who plays for Qingdao Youth Island as a forward.

Club career
On 22 September 2018, Té made his professional debut with Vitória Setúbal in a 2018–19 Primeira Liga match against 
FC Porto.

References

External links

1997 births
Living people
Bissau-Guinean footballers
Association football forwards
Primeira Liga players
Campeonato de Portugal (league) players
Vitória F.C. players
Clube Olímpico do Montijo players
C.D. Mafra players
F.C. Arouca players